William Finlayson may refer to:
 William Finlayson (Australian politician) (1867–1955), Member of the House of Representatives for the seat of Brisbane 1910–1919
 William Finlayson (Canadian politician) (1875–?), lawyer and political figure in Ontario 
 William Finlayson (churchman) (1813–1897), churchman and farmer in the colony of South Australia